Barsaat ( Rain) is a 1995 Indian Hindi-language romantic action film, which was the debut of Bobby Deol (son of veteran actor Dharmendra) and Twinkle Khanna (daughter of late actor Rajesh Khanna). The film was directed by Rajkumar Santoshi. The movie was initially titled Jaan, later changed to Meri Jeet, then Jeet and then Satwa Asmaan, before the Deols settled on Barsaat.

Both Deol and Khanna won the Filmfare Awards in the Best Debut categories. Incidentally, after 10 years, Deol worked in a 2005 film of the same name.

Plot 

Badal (Bobby Deol) is a naive but intelligent young man who comes from a small village to the big city to attend college. He is introduced to city life by his former villager Damru (Harish Patel), who calls himself Danny. When Badal attends college, he meets pretty and precocious Tina Oberoi (Twinkle Khanna) and, after a few misunderstandings and misadventures, they fall in love.

This relationship is not approved of by Tina's wealthy widower step-dad Dinesh Oberoi (Raj Babbar), who hopes to takes all her wealth. He is waiting for Tina To turn eighteen. His friend (Bharat Kapoor) wants his son to marry Tina and divide the whole wealth. Once his son finds out about love of Tina and Badal, he complains to the college principal (Vijay Kashyap), that Badal has been responsible for sexually harassing a girl at the college one night, but Tina testifies in favour of Badal and insists he's innocent. Dinesh then asks a corrupt cop, Negi, (Danny Denzongpa) the city's assistant commissioner of police, for assistance.

Negi arrests Badal on trumped-up charges and imprisons him. Badal's widowed dad Bhairon (Mukesh Khanna) comes to the big city to try to make sense of why Badal is in prison. Dinesh gives a contract to Negi to have Badal killed. Negi agrees and hires a gang of ruthless outlaws to hunt and kill Badal. Both of them run away to Badal’s village. However, Negi reaches there and threatens the villagers. To save the villagers, Badal gives Tina sleeping tablets by lying to her that both of them are committing suicide. He then surrenders himself to Negi.

When Tina wakes up, she finds herself in the custody of her step dad who tries to kills her by giving her poison, but her friend tells her the truth as now he realises the true intention of Dinesh who never wanted Tina to marry his son.
She is obviously shocked to find the truth and run in car.

By this time, Badal and Negi had a face off where Negi is killed (as shown) by Badal and now he comes to save Tina from Dinesh who is behind her to kill him.
Both of them are fighting on the hill where Tina pleads Badal not to kill Dinesh as she considers him her father.
However, Negi again comes to kill Badal and saved by Dinesh.
Negi is finally killed by Bhairon and two others. At last, Tina and Badal unite with the dying Dinesh, approving their match and apologising for his deeds.

Cast 

 Bobby Deol as Badal
 Twinkle Khanna as Tina Oberoi
 Raj Babbar as Dinesh Oberoi
 Mukesh Khanna as Bhairon, Badal's father
 Harish Patel as Damru "Danny"
 Anjan Srivastav as Maula Ram
 Bharat Kapoor as R.K. Mehra
 Ashwin Kaushal as Bhushi
 Vijay Kashyap as Kapurchand, college principal
 Viju Khote as Tom Tom
 Shehzad Khan as Khan Bhai
 Suresh Bhagwat as Director
 Danny Denzongpa as ACP Negi
 Kiran Juneja as Tina's late mother and Suresh's late wife

Production
Initially, Shekar Kapur was set to direct this film and had shot a scene with Deol. However, he left the film for Bandit Queen and Rajkumar Santoshi took over as director. He had both the lead actors attend workshops. While shooting a scene in London, Deol suffered a leg injury and had to use crutches for over a year. He continued shooting for the film Gupt: The Hidden Truth with his injured leg. A few scenes were shot at Rohtang Pass near Manali, Himachal Pradesh. Khanna fainted once while filming there. Reportedly both the lead actors did not go along well during the shooting. Deol irritated Khanna on many occasions and the latter found it "obnoxious".

Box office 

Its total net gross collection was 29 crores and it was declared a "Super Hit" grosser by Box Office India. It was also the 5th highest-grossing movie of the year.

Soundtrack 

The film score of Barsaat was composed by Louis Banks while the songs were composed by Nadeem Shravan with lyrics penned by Sameer.

The songs of the film are popular even in 2020, especially "Humko Sirf Tumse Pyaar Hai" and "Nahin Yeh Ho Nahin Sakta". Hindustan Times called the latter song "the definition of the lovelorn ‘90s" and "[s]till the most played song on every desi diljala aashiq’s list".

Reception
Barsaat was a "hugely-anticipated film". Writing for Rediff.com, Sukanya Verma called it "not a great movie" but was appreciative of Santosh Sivan's cinematography, especially during the song "Nahi Yeh Ho Nahi Sakta", noting that the "freshness enveloping Sivan’s visuals in the song ... choreographed by Farah Khan, continues to satisfy" and "I love the luminously lit frames, the use of fresh paint and mirrors and a gorgeous play of pristine white and bright yellow." A review in India Today noted that the film lacked a script and is "yet another collection of cliches". It found the songs "mediocre" and concluded with "[t]he best part is that two stars are born".

Filmfare Awards 

 Best Male Debut - Bobby Deol
 Best Female Debut - Twinkle Khanna
 Best Cinematographer - Santosh Sivan
 Best Sound - Rakesh Ranjan

See also 

 List of Bollywood films of 1995

References

External links 

 

1995 films
Films scored by Nadeem–Shravan
Films directed by Rajkumar Santoshi
1990s Hindi-language films
Vijayta Films films
Films shot in Himachal Pradesh
Films shot in London